Association football clubs around the world sometimes retire squad numbers to recognise players' loyal service, most as a memorial after their death.

Background 

This practice, long established in the major North American sports, is a recent development in football elsewhere, since squad numbers for specific players were not widely used until the 1990s. Before then, it was typical for players in the starting lineup to be issued numbers 1 to 11 by formation/position on a match-by-match basis, and substitutes to be numbered from 12 upwards, meaning a player might wear different numbers during the season if they were to play in different positions for tactical reasons, or simply not be a regular in the starting lineup.

In contrast, in the American league NASL, players have always worn permanent numbers since its inception in 1967. Moreover, Pelé's #10 was retired by the New York Cosmos during the farewell of the Brazilian star on 1 October 1977, probably becoming the first number ever retired in association football.

Mexico was a pioneer country in the use of permanent numbers in football; these were adopted in the Primera División in the 1980s.

Retiring a player's shirt number usually occurs after the player has left the team or retired. It honours a player who has meant much to his club, and no other player is permitted to use that number in the future. In some cases, such as those of Jason Mayélé, Vittorio Mero, Marc-Vivien Foé, Miklós Fehér, Ray Jones, Dylan Tombides, François Sterchele, David di Tommaso, Antonio Puerta, Besian Idrizaj, Piermario Morosini and Davide Astori, numbers have been retired to posthumously honour a player who died while still active. Also, Norwegian club Fredrikstad retired Dagfinn Enerly's number following an on-pitch accident that left him paralysed. In Britain, only Bobby Moore's, Jack Lester's and Jude Bellingham's shirt numbers have been retired due to great service to the club as opposed to a tragic incident. Although it has not been officially retired, Gianfranco Zola's No. 25 shirt has not been reissued by Chelsea since he left the club in 2003.

The Argentina, Ecuador and Cameroon national teams have been prevented from retiring the numbers of Diego Maradona (10), Christian Benítez (11) and Marc-Vivien Foé (17), respectively, by FIFA rules dealing with squad numbers for Finals tournaments; in other competitions, qualifiers or friendlies, national associations may assign numbers according to criteria of their choosing. Similarly, several clubs have been required to reissue retired numbers for continental club competitions due to squad numbering rules of continental confederations. For example, CAF and CONMEBOL have such rules in their club competitions, but CONCACAF does not.

Some South American teams (such as Universitario de Deportes and Flamengo, and even Mexican teams invited for the occasions) have occasionally had to re-issue their retired numbers for special cases due to CONMEBOL rules, which state that shirts must be numbered 1–25 in continental club competitions (such as Copa Libertadores and Copa Sudamericana, among others).

Retired numbers 

Notes

Special cases 

Notes

Dedication to fans

Number 12 
Some clubs dedicate a number to their fans, and do not issue it to any player. The most common number for this practice is 12, from descriptions of the fans as "the twelfth man". Clubs and teams that do not give the '12' to any player include:

 Tirana
 Melbourne Victory
 Perth Glory
 Club Brugge
 Genk
 Sarajevo 
 Atlético Mineiro
 Avaí
 Flamengo
 Botev Plovdiv
 CF Montréal
 Beijing Guoan
 Changchun Yatai
 Shandong Luneng Taishan
 Tianjin Jinmen Tigers
 Zhejiang Yiteng
 Hajduk Split
 Omonia
 Sparta Prague
 AGF
 OB
 Bristol Rovers
 Gillingham
 Oxford United
 Oldham Athletic
 Plymouth Argyle
 Portsmouth
 Reading
 Flora
 Lens
 Mikkelin Palloilijat
 Arminia Bielefeld 
 Bayern Munich
 Borussia Mönchengladbach
 Rot-Weiss Essen
 TuS Koblenz
 Werder Bremen
 PAOK
 Ferencváros
 Újpest
 Kerala Blasters
 Persija Jakarta
 Foolad
 Persepolis
 Cork City
 Shamrock Rovers
 Atalanta
 Cesena
 Genoa
 Lazio
 Palermo
 Parma
 Torino
 FC Seoul
 Jeonbuk Hyundai Motors FC
 Incheon United
 Jeju United FC
 Seoul United
 FK Ekranas
 Terengganu
 Valletta
 Monterrey
 UANL
 Guadalajara
 Yagon United
 Yadanarbon
 Thanlyin Technological University
 PSV Eindhoven
 Feyenoord
 Vitesse
 PEC Zwolle
 Roda JC Kerkrade
 IK Start
 Vålerenga
 Pogoń Szczecin
 Lech Poznań
 Polonia Warsaw
 Vitória de Guimarães
 Rapid București
 Zenit Saint Petersburg
 CSKA Moscow
 Aberdeen
 Hibernian
 Rangers
 Red Star Belgrade
 AIK
 Hammarby IF
 Malmö FF
 GIF Sundsvall
 Basel
 Club Africain
 Bangkok United
 Chonburi
 BEC Tero Sasana
 Muangthong United
 Port
 Buriram United
 Fenerbahçe
 Sivasspor
 Dynamo Kyiv
 Hà Nội FC

Notes

Other numbers retired 
 1 – AIK and Djurgården IF reserve the number for their supporters.
 7 – Paysandu reserve the number for their supporters.
 10 – Levadiakos have reserved the number for the club president, Giannis Kobotis.
 11 – Indy Eleven reserve the number for their supporters.
 13 – Gillingham use the number for the 'Rainham End' Stand of Priestfield Stadium as this stand holds the majority of hardcore supporters.
 13 – Reading and Bryne reserve the number for their supporters, Panathinaikos reserve the number in honour of Gate 13, the ultras based in the respective gate in home matches. Between 2002 and 2007 Norwich City reserved the number 13 shirt for "the fans" after which it was worn by Declan Rudd while Shrewsbury Town reserve the number 13 shirt for the fan who wins a pre-season competition.
 16 – Bursaspor reserve the number for their supporters.
 17 – Atlanta United FC reserve the number for their supporters and to reference their inaugural season in Major League Soccer. For the 2021 MLS season, the club also reserved the number 44 as part of a tribute by Atlanta-area sports teams in memory of Henry Aaron of the local MLB club, who died 22 January 2021, where all sports teams in the area reserved the No. 44 for the year.
 17 – Sagan Tosu retired the number in dedication to their fans.
 27 – Bournemouth use squad number for the Steve Fletcher Stand which houses the large majority of hardcore supporters, the number 50 for "12th man" and the number 99 shirt for their mascot, Cherry Bear.
 33 – Remo reserve the number for their supporters.
 40 – Oldham Athletic reserve the number for their fans.
 55 – Rochdale retired the number on 13 January 2017 in honour of five-year old Joshua McCormack who died of cancer.
 58 – Portsmouth retired the number for their mascot Nelson, with Nelson’s name and number appearing on club issued match day programmes
 79 – APOEL have reserved the shirt number in honour of PAN.SY.FI. (APOEL Ultras), to denote the year the group was founded, 1979.

References

Association football terminology
Association football culture
Association football records and statistics
association football